The 1976 Mexico City WCT was a men's tennis tournament played on indoor carpet courts in Mexico City, Mexico. The event was part of the 1976 World Championship Tennis circuit. It was the inaugural edition of the tournament and was held from 9 March until 14 March 1976. Fourth-seeded Raúl Ramírez won the singles title.

Finals

Singles
 Raúl Ramírez defeated  Eddie Dibbs, 7–6, 6–2
 It was Ramírez' 1st singles title of the year and the 8th of his career.

Doubles
 Brian Gottfried /  Raúl Ramírez defeated  Ismail El Shafei /  Brian Fairlie, 6–4, 7–6(7–4)

See also
 1976 Monterrey WCT

References

External links
 ITF tournament edition details

Mexico City
Mex
Mexico City WCT